2004 S.League was the ninth season of Singapore's professional football league. It was won by Tampines Rovers, which was their first league title.

Changes from 2003
 Penalty kicks after draws were discontinued.
 Albirex Niigata (S) are the feeder team of J.League club Albirex Niigata.
 Sengkang Marine withdrew from the league at the end of 2003 season.

Foreign players
Each club is allowed to have up to a maximum of 4 foreign players.

Albirex Niigata (S) and Sinchi FC are not allowed to hire any foreigners.

League table

Top scorers

References

External links
 S.League 2004

Singapore Premier League seasons
1
Sing
Sing